Heikki Soininen (7 January 1891, Polvijärvi – 19 April 1957) was a Finnish farmer and politician. He served as a Member of the Parliament of Finland from 1933 until his death in 1957, representing the Agrarian League.

References

1891 births
1957 deaths
People from Polvijärvi
People from Kuopio Province (Grand Duchy of Finland)
Centre Party (Finland) politicians
Members of the Parliament of Finland (1933–36)
Members of the Parliament of Finland (1936–39)
Members of the Parliament of Finland (1939–45)
Members of the Parliament of Finland (1945–48)
Members of the Parliament of Finland (1948–51)
Members of the Parliament of Finland (1951–54)
Members of the Parliament of Finland (1954–58)
Finnish people of World War II